Kirip Chaliha (born 1November 1955) is a member of the 14th Lok Sabha of India. He represents the Gauhati constituency of Assam and is a member of the Indian National Congress (INC) political party.

He was also previously a member of the 10th Lok Sabha also having represented the Gauhati.

External links
 Home Page on the Parliament of India's Website

1955 births
Indian National Congress politicians
Living people
India MPs 2004–2009
People from Dibrugarh district
India MPs 1991–1996
Lok Sabha members from Assam
United Progressive Alliance candidates in the 2014 Indian general election
Indian National Congress politicians from Assam